Hogans Corner is a census-designated place (CDP) in Grays Harbor County, Washington, United States. The population was 85 at the 2010 census. Prior to 2010 it was part of the combined Oyehut-Hogan's Corner CDP.

Geography
Hogans Corner is located in western Grays Harbor County around the intersection of Washington State Routes 109 and 115. SR 109 leads east  to Hoquiam and north along the Pacific coast to Ocean City and Copalis Beach. SR 115 leads south  to Oyehut and Ocean Shores.

References

Census-designated places in Grays Harbor County, Washington
Census-designated places in Washington (state)